Jordan Groshans (born November 10, 1999) is an American professional baseball infielder for the Miami Marlins of Major League Baseball (MLB). He made his MLB debut in 2022.

Amateur career
Groshans attended Magnolia High School in Magnolia, Texas. In July 2017, the summer before his senior year, he played in the Under Armour All American Game at Wrigley Field. As a senior, he batted .444 with 11 home runs and 36 runs batted in (RBIs). Prior to the 2018 draft, he had committed to play college baseball at the University of Kansas.

Professional career

Toronto Blue Jays
Groshans was selected 12th overall by the Toronto Blue Jays in the 2018 Major League Baseball draft. He signed with the Blue Jays on June 12 and received a $3.4 million signing bonus. Groshans was assigned to the Rookie-level Gulf Coast League Blue Jays to begin his professional career before being promoted to the Bluefield Blue Jays of the Advanced-Rookie Appalachian League in August. In 48 games between the two clubs, Groshans hit .296 with five home runs and 43 RBIs.

Groshans began 2019 with the Lansing Lugnuts of the Class A Midwest League. He appeared in only 23 games, batting .337 with two home runs and 13 RBIs before being shut down for the remainder of the season with a foot injury. He did not play a minor league game in 2020 due to the cancellation of the season caused by the COVID-19 pandemic. For the 2021 season, he was assigned to the New Hampshire Fisher Cats of the Double-A Northeast. He missed playing time in May due to a sore back and was also placed on the injured list in early September, causing him to miss the end of the season. Over 75 games for the season, Groshans slashed .291/.367/.450 with seven home runs and forty RBIs. He opened the 2022 season on the injured list with an oblique strain. He was activated shortly after the season started and was assigned to the Buffalo Bisons of the Triple-A International League.

Miami Marlins
Groshans was traded to the Miami Marlins for Anthony Bass, Zach Pop, and a player to be named later on August 2, 2022. He was assigned to the Jacksonville Jumbo Shrimp of the Triple-A International League. 

On September 13, 2022, the Marlins selected Groshans's contract and promoted him to the major leagues. On September 15, Groshans hit his first major league home run against off of Noah Syndergaard of Philadelphia Phillies.

Personal life
Groshans' older brother, Jaxx, played college baseball at the University of Kansas, was drafted in the fifth round of the 2019 Major League Baseball draft by the Boston Red Sox, and currently plays in their organization.

References

External links

1999 births
Living people
Baseball players from Texas
Bluefield Blue Jays players
Buffalo Bisons (minor league) players
Dunedin Blue Jays players
Gulf Coast Blue Jays players
Jacksonville Jumbo Shrimp players
Lansing Lugnuts players
Major League Baseball infielders
Miami Marlins players
New Hampshire Fisher Cats players
People from Magnolia, Texas